The 1941–42 Cupa României was the ninth edition of Romania's most prestigious football cup competition.

The title was won by Rapid București against Universitatea Cluj-Sibiu.

Format
The competition is an annual knockout tournament with pairings for each round drawn at random.

There are no seeds for the draw. The draw also determines which teams will play at home. Each tie is played as a single leg.

If a match is drawn after 90 minutes, the game goes in extra time, and if the scored is still tight after 120 minutes, there a replay will be played, usually at the ground of the team who were away for the first game.

The format is almost similar with the oldest recognised football tournament in the world FA Cup.

This season, due to World War II, no official editions of Divizia A, Divizia B or Divizia C were played. Another Cup Competition was played instead called 1942 Heroes Cup.

First round proper

|colspan=3 style="background-color:#FFCCCC;"|14 May 1942

|-
|colspan=3 style="background-color:#FFCCCC;"|21 May 1942

|-
|colspan=3 style="background-color:#FFCCCC;"|24 May 1942

|}

8 Teams Bye to Second round proper: Unirea Tricolor București, Venus București, Sportul Studențesc București, Juventus București, Rapid București, Ripensia Timișoara, Gloria Arad, Mica Brad

Second round proper

|colspan=3 style="background-color:#FFCCCC;"|24 May 1942

|-
|colspan=3 style="background-color:#FFCCCC;"|25 May 1942

|-
|colspan=3 style="background-color:#FFCCCC;"|31 May 1942

|}

Quarter-finals 

|colspan=3 style="background-color:#FFCCCC;"|28 June 1942

|-
|colspan=3 style="background-color:#FFCCCC;"|17 July 1942 — Replay

|}

Semi-finals

|colspan=3 style="background-color:#FFCCCC;"|19 July 1942

|}

Final

References

External links
 romaniansoccer.ro
 Official site

Cupa României seasons
1941–42 in Romanian football
1941–42 domestic association football cups